The 165th Airlift Wing (165 AW) is a unit of the Georgia Air National Guard, stationed at Savannah Air National Guard Base, in the U.S. state of Georgia. If activated to federal service, the wing is gained by the United States Air Force Air Mobility Command.

Overview
The mission of the 165th Airlift Wing is to provide tactical airlift of personnel, equipment and supplies worldwide.

Units
The 165th Airlift Wing consists of the following units:
 165th Operations Group
 158th Airlift Squadron
 165th Mission Support Group
 165th Maintenance Group
 165th Medical Group
 224th Joint Communications Support Squadron
 165th Air Support Operations Squadron (ASOS)
 117th Air Control Squadron (ACS)

History
On 10 July 1958, the Georgia Air National Guard 158th Fighter-Interceptor Squadron was authorized to expand to a group level, and the 165th Fighter-Interceptor Group was established by the National Guard Bureau. The 158th FIS becoming the group's flying squadron. Other squadrons assigned into the group were the 165th Headquarters, 165th Material Squadron (Maintenance), 165th Combat Support Squadron, and the 165th USAF Dispensary.

Gained by Air Defense Command, along with the activation of the group, the 158th FIS was re-equipped with the F-86L Sabre Interceptor, a day/night/all-weather aircraft designed to be integrated into the ADC SAGE interceptor direction and control system. In 1958, the 116th implemented the ADC Runway Alert Program, in which interceptors of the 128th Fighter-Interceptor Squadron were committed to a five-minute runway alert.

Airlift mission

Reorganization came in 1962 when the unit transitioned from a fighter mission to an airlift mission The 158th Fighter Squadron became 158th Air Transport Squadron on 1 July 1962 assigned to the 165th Air Group. They traded in its Sabre interceptors for 4-engines C-97 Stratofreighter transports. With air transportation recognized as a critical wartime need, the squadron was re-designated the 128th Air Transport Squadron (Heavy).  The 116th ATG was assigned to the MATS Eastern Transport Air Force, (EASTAF), and the squadron flew long-distance transport missions in support of Air Force requirements, frequently sending aircraft to the Caribbean, Europe Greenland, and the Middle East in support of Air Force requirements.

In 1966 MATS became the Military Airlift Command (MAC) and EASTAF became the MAC Twenty-First Air Force.  The 116th ATG was upgraded to the C-124 Globemaster II strategic heavy airlifter in 1965.  Due to requirements generated by the Vietnam War, missions were flown across the Pacific to Hawaii, Japan, the Philippines, South Vietnam, Okinawa and Thailand.

On 8 August 1975, the first of the C-130E aircraft, aptly named "Hercules", came to the City of Savannah at the international airport to replace the older C-124's. While the C-124's were being retired from the Air Force inventory, the C-130s were arriving at the 165th Tactical Airlift Group.

The 158th received seven new C-130H Hercules aircraft directly from the Lockheed Factory manufactured for the unit during September and October 1981. On 15 April 1992, the unit was redesignated the 165th Airlift Group. On 1 October 1995, the unit received its current designation, the 165th Airlift Wing.

In 2005, the unit deployed aircraft and more than 100 personnel to Karshi-Khanabad, Uzbekistan, for 11 months. During this period, the unit airlifted more than 35,660 tons of cargo in support of the Global War on Terror.

Since the beginning of operations in the Persian Gulf, the 165th Airlift Wing has been integrally involved in air operations. Several elements of the wing have been deployed throughout the region, with airmen serving in Uzbekistan, Turkey, Kuwait, Iraq and Afghanistan. In 2009, the 165th Airlift Wing deployed to Afghanistan in support of Operation Enduring Freedom.

Recent deployments

On 25 January 2010, a small group of Airmen deployed from the 165th Airlift Wing to Haiti in support of the Haitian relief efforts.

In January 2011, the last of six C-130H2 Hercules aircraft began a three-month stint at Bagram Air Base. This was the ninth time the 165th has deployed – to Iraq or Afghanistan – since 11 September 2001, in support of the War on Terror. Deploying with the aircraft were more than 150 Georgia Guard airmen, including all of the wing's operations division and more than 50 percent of its maintenance department.

During the summer of 2011, Air Guard personnel from Savannah's 165th Airlift Wing assisted the Georgia Forestry Commission in fighting wildfires in southern Georgia.

From August 2012 until March 2013, 14 airmen from the 165th Airlift Wing's Aerial Port Squadron deployed to Camp Bastion, Afghanistan, in support of Operation Enduring Freedom.

Disaster response
In January 2010, in response to the earthquake in Haiti, the 165th Airlift Wing placed a C-130 aircraft and crew on standby for the relief effort as ordered by the National Guard Bureau. The 165th quickly established a kitchen and dining area, one of fifteen in the burgeoning military sections of the city.

Lineage
 Designated 165th Fighter-Interceptor Group, and allotted to Georgia ANG, 1958
 Extended federal recognition and activated, 10 July 1958
 Re-designated: 165th Air Transport Group, 1 July 1962
 Re-designated: 165th Military Airlift Group, 3 January 1966
 Re-designated: 165th Tactical Airlift Group, 8 August 1975
 Re-designated: 165th Airlift Group, 16 March 1992
 Status changed from group to wing, 1 October 1995
 Re-designated: 165th Airlift Wing, 1 October 1995

Assignments
 Georgia Air National Guard, 10 July 1958 – Present
 Gained by: 35th Air Division, Air Defense Command
 Gained by: Eastern Transport Air Force, Military Air Transport Service, 1 July 1962
 Gained by: Twenty-First Air Force, Military Airlift Command, 3 January 1966
 Gained by: Air Combat Command, 1 June 1992
 Gained by: Air Mobility Command, 1 April 1997

Components
 165th Operations Group, 1 October 1995 – Present
 158th Fighter-Interceptor (later Air Transport, Military Airlift, Tactical Airlift, Airlift) Squadron, 10 July 1958 – 1 October 1995
 Assigned to 165 OG 1 October 1995–Present

Stations
 Travis Field (later Savannah International Airport), 10 July 1958
 Designated: Savannah Air National Guard Base, 1991–Present

Aircraft

 F-86L Sabre Interceptor, 1958–1962
 C-97F Stratofreighter, 1962–1965
 C-124C Globemaster II, 1965–1975

 C-130E Hercules, 1975–1981
 C-130H Hercules, 1981–Present

Decorations
 Air Force Outstanding Unit Award

References

 Rogers, B. (2006). United States Air Force Unit Designations Since 1978. 
 Cornett, Lloyd H. and Johnson, Mildred W., A Handbook of Aerospace Defense Organization 1946–1980, Office of History, Aerospace Defense Center, Peterson AFB, CO (1980).
 History of the 165th Airlift Wing

External links
165th Airlift Wing official website
Georgia Department of Defense official website
165th Airlift Wing Facebook Page
The Professional Guardsman Blog 
165th Airlift Wing Flickr Page
Georgia Guard Twitter Page
Georgia Guard Youtube Channel
Historical Society of the Georgia National Guard
Georgia Department of Defense 2010 Annual Report

0165
Wings of the United States Air National Guard
Military units and formations in Georgia (U.S. state)